Joseph Allen Tate (born December 13, 1980)  is an American politician and former professional football player from Michigan. Tate has served as a Democratic member of Michigan House of Representatives from District 2 since 2019 and Speaker of the Michigan House of Representatives since 2023.

Early life 
Tate was born in Detroit, Michigan, the youngest of four children.  His father Coleman Sr. was a Detroit firefighter who lost his life when Tate was an infant.  His mother, Debra was a Detroit public school teacher.  Tate spent his early years in the Jefferson Chalmers and Sherwood Forest communities of Detroit.  His mother later moved the family to Southfield, Michigan where Tate attended Southfield-Lathrup High School, graduating in 1999.

Education, Athletics, and Military Service

Michigan State University Undergrad 
Immediately after high school, Tate attended Michigan State University on a football scholarship.  Tate earned four letters at Michigan State from 2000-03 and started 29 games his last three years at left guard. A two-time Academic All-Big Ten selection in 2000 and 2001, he garnered second-team All-Big Ten honors from the media in 2003 as the Spartans went 8-4 in the regular season and played in the Alamo Bowl against Nebraska. He made his mark off the field as well during his time in East Lansing, as he also was presented MSU's Community Service and Leadership Award.

National Football League 
Tate graduated M.S.U. in 2003 with a degree in public policy and was then signed by the Jacksonville Jaguars as an offensive lineman. He later played for the Atlanta Falcons and St. Louis Rams.

Michigan State University Masters and Graduate Assistant 
After two seasons with the NFL, Tate returned to Michigan State University to pursue a masters degree in kinesiology while serving as a strength and conditioning graduate assistant under coach Ken Mannie in 2007 and 2008.

U.S.M.C. Service 
In 2009, Tate joined the U.S. Marine Corps as an officer, serving two deployments in Afghanistan as platoon commander and company executive officer of his infantry unit.  After an honorable discharge, Tate returned to his native Michigan to pursue his MBA and career in public service.

University of Michigan Dual Masters 
Tate attended the University of Michigan's prestigious Ross School of Business and School of Natural Resources obtaining his dual MBA/MS in 2017.   Serving his first year as president of the Michigan Ross student government association, Tate quickly emerged at Michigan as a talented and well-respected leader.

Public Service and Political Career

Detroit Economic Growth Corporation 
Upon graduation in 2017, Tate became a program manager at Detroit Economic Growth Corporation.

Michigan Politics 
On November 6, 2018, Tate won the general election and became a member of Michigan House of Representatives, serving District 2, a diverse community that covers part of Detroit’s Lower East Side, Grosse Pointe Park, Grosse Pointe City, and Grosse Pointe Farms. He was elected to a second term in 2020.  After the Democratic Party gained control of the Michigan House of Representatives in the 2022 Michigan House of Representatives elections, Tate became the first African American to be elected Speaker of the Michigan House of Representatives.

References

External links 
 Joe Tate at housedems.com
 Joe Tate at footballdb.com

1980 births
20th-century African-American people
21st-century African-American politicians
21st-century American politicians
African-American state legislators in Michigan
Atlanta Falcons players
Democratic Party members of the Michigan House of Representatives
Jacksonville Jaguars players
Living people
Ross School of Business alumni
St. Louis Rams players